Lucăcilă River may refer to:

 Lucăcilă, a tributary of the Brătei in Dâmbovița County 
 Lucăcilă, a tributary of the Ialomița in Dâmbovița County
 Vâlcelul Lucăcilă, a tributary of the Brătei in Dâmbovița County

See also 
 Lucăceni (disambiguation)
 Lucăcești (disambiguation)